is a Japanese actor, playwright and theatre director who has written and directed more than 40 plays in Japan, and is working to bring modern Japanese theatre to an international audience.

Biography
Noda was born in Nagasaki, Japan. He briefly attended Tokyo University to study law but eventually dropped out. Noda debuted his first play, An Encounter Between Love and Death during his second year of high school. His second play, The Advent of the Beast, was well received by critics in 1981. This led to his invitation to perform at the Edinburgh International Festival in Scotland, which he already participated in three years earlier. In 2008 he was also appointed artistic director of Tokyo Metropolitan Art Space in Ikebukuro, and became a professor in the Department of Scenography Design, Drama, and Dance at Tama Art University.

When he was four years old, his family moved from Kyushu to Tokyo. When he reached the age of 16, Noda wrote and staged his very first play. With his high-school friends, he decided to title it, Ai to Shi o Mitsumete (Gaze into Love and Death). Later on in 1976, Noda founded his theatre company named Yume no Yuminsha (Dreaming Bohemian), while he was still in Tokyo University as a law student. Yume no Yuminsha became the emblem of the country's vibrant youth theatre firmament and the leader of a nationwide cultural movement in the early 1980s known as Sho-gekijo (Small-scale Theatre Movement).

In 1992, Noda went to London to study theatre. When he returned to Japan, he started the independent company Noda Map, to promote and produce his own plays. He is currently held in high regard within the Japanese theatre community. Japanese theatre director Yukio Ninagawa said of him, "Hideki Noda is the most talented playwright in contemporary Japan."

At the age of 27, Noda won Japan's most prestigious theatre accolade, the Kishida Prize for Drama for Nokemono Kitarite (Descent of the Brutes). Tickets to his plays became the hottest of all to get a hold of. Further pushed by Japan's economy, Yume no Yuminsha broke all kinds of records by drawing as much as 26,000 audience to a one-day event at which Noda staged his version of Wagner's The Ring of the Nibelungs presented as a Stonehenge trilogy at the Yoyogi National Gymnasium in Tokyo.

In 2006, Noda Hideki wrote The Bee which is coauthored by Colin Teevan. This play was adapted to theater from Tsutsui Yasutaka's novel Mushiriai (Plucking at Each Other). In 2006, The Bee was first staged in English by Soho Theatre and NODA MAP, and in 2007 in Japan by NODA MAP.
He is currently in charge of The New National Theatre, where he works as a director. His plays focus on including celebrities to attract a wider audience rather than experimenting with different forms. Even though he primarily focuses on who he casts to play characters, "he brings in new audiences aplenty and also surreptitiously manages to sneak in satirical themes that only someone with his calibre could."

He became artistic director at the Tokyo Metropolitan Theatre in 2009.

Style
The most notable characteristics of Noda's plays are his use of limericks and word play. He frequently uses obsolete and old terminology from famous pieces of classical literature as if they were modern-day terms. This helps to create a separate world in which his plays can exist – apart from the reality of the audience. His plays, while often dealing with cliché or everyday topics, try to present the issues in a new way, and his use of old and odd language helps to emphasize the play's theme.

Noda was initially interested in revitalizing Japanese theater and to break away from the stylised theatre of Noh and Kabuki. His objective was to be as strange and entertaining as possible, touching on modern values, concerns and social issues. This resulted in a unique and highly stylized visual performance of design and movement. He often takes classical Japanese literature and plays and re-vitalizes them in a modern form.

Works
Noda's work falls into two periods: first from 1976 to 1992, with his Dream Wanderers theater company, and second in 1993, mainly with his Noda Map production company.

From 1976 to 1992, Noda became famous for this "theater as a sport" approach to performance, showing off the high-speed, complex spectacles that celebrated "boyhood" to the audience. Some of his major productions are The Prisoner of Zenda Castle (Zenda-jō no toriko, 1981) and Here Comes the Wild Beast (Nokemono kitarite, 1984), which was characterized by zany wordplay, rapid-fire delivery, and frenetic movement.

The turning point in Noda's career was in late 1992 while he was living in London. A year later, he founded Noda Map where he worked at kabukiand opera and produced his own plays. Noda's plays have moved beyond the child's dream world to social issues such as nationalism, colonialism, sexuality and crime. The major full-length works are Kill (Kiru, 1994) and Pandora's Bell (Pandora no kane, 1999).

Plays
His first international work was Red Demon, which he performed in Japan for the first time in 1997 and then in English at the Young Vic Theatre in London in 2003. The cast included Marcello Magni, Tamzin Griffin and Simon MacGregor, with Noda himself playing the Red Demon. The play has also been performed in Thai and Korean. Each version was translated and re-worked in an attempt to be more appealing to each specific culture. For example, the Thai version of the play included music that was neither in the original Japanese version, nor in the English version.

The story is that of a man who is washed up on an isolated island with no means of communicating where he is from. The sheltered islanders mistake him for a demon. The result is a black comedy that revolves around the theme of tolerance vs. discrimination.

The English version was criticized by the Japanese media as no longer resembling Noda Hideki's work – the translation lost the poetry and nuance that the Japanese work emphasized. Noda Hideki, while having studied abroad, is not known for his English-speaking ability and had the script translated and rewritten by English writers Roger Pulvers and Matt Wilkinson.

Noda has been collaborating with the playwright Colin Teevan and the actress Kathryn Hunter, producing English versions of The Bee (2006) and The Diver (2008) in London. He was also a member of the cast for these productions. The Japanese version of The Diver was performed in Tokyo in 2009 with Shinobu Otake.

Yume no Yuminsha garnered enough popular reception to be invited to the Edinburgh international Theatre Festival in 1987 with Nokemono Kitarite, and in 1990 with Hanshin: Half-God. Also in 1990, the company was invited to the first New York International Art Festival to perform Suisei no Siegfried (A Messenger from the Comet).
Noda was getting more involved in working with other dramatists and actors outside of Yume no Yuminsha; which led to acclaimed stagings of his radical takes on Shakespeare's Twelfth Night, Much Ado About Nothing and A Midsummer Night’s Dream. Both were collaborated with Toho, one of the Japan's leading production companies.

Awards and honors

1983 – The 27th Kunio Kishida Drama Award for 
1985 – Kinokuniya Drama Award: Individual Awards
1990 – Arts Festival Award of Agency for Cultural Affairs for 
1994 – The 19th Teatoru Drama Award
1998 – The 23rd Kazuo Kikuta Drama Award for the direction of 
1999 – The 2nd Nanboku Tsuruya Drama Award for Right Eye
2000 – The 34th Kunio Kishida Drama Award (Individual Award) and the 50th Minister of Education Award for the direction of  
2001 – The 1st Asahi Performing arts Award Grand Prix for 
2007 – The 58th Yomiuri Prize for

See also
Ai Nagai Japanese playwright, stage director, co-founder and leader of Nitosha
Toshiki Okada Japanese playwright, theater director, novelist, founder of Chelfitsch
Kunio Shimizu Japanese playwright

References

External links 
 NODA MAP
Profile on Performing Arts Network Japan
Artist Database
Interview

Noda
Noda
Noda
Yomiuri Prize winners
20th-century Japanese dramatists and playwrights
21st-century Japanese dramatists and playwrights